Mehrdad Ardeshi is an Iranian chess International Master born on January 1, 1979, in Tehran, Iran. He is also the coach of the Iranian national youth chess team.

Early life 
Mehrdad Ardeshi was interested in chess since he was a teenager, but his father strongly forbid him from doing so that as not to damage his studies,  but he continued to try. After the death of his father in 1997, he continued in this field with the support of his mother, and after marriage, his wife became his second supporter in this field. He is also a close friend of Morteza Mahjoub and uncle of Iranian filmmaker Danial Hajibarat.

Professional activity 
Ardeshi is the head coach of the Iranian Chess national youth team, and in 2020, won the third place in the World Junior Chess Championship held online in Georgia.
He is the chairman of the training committee of the Iranian Chess Federation, a member of the Iranian national team, and a participant in the World Chess Olympiad that It was the last year that Garry Kasparov was present.

Mehrdad Ardeshi is Champion of the West Asian Qualifiers, the first joint winner of the international competitions of the Fajr decade, two years champion of the Iranian Premier League with Bahman and Railway teams, 4 years individual champion of the Iranian Premier League.

References

External links

Chess International Masters
1979 births
Living people
People from Tehran
Iranian chess players
Asian Games competitors for Iran